The 1984 Oklahoma State Cowboys football team represented Oklahoma State University during the 1984 NCAA Division I-A football season.

Schedule

*Schedule Source:

Personnel

Rankings

Game summaries

at Arizona State

San Diego State

at Nebraska

at Oklahoma

vs. South Carolina (Gator Bowl)

After the season

The 1985 NFL Draft was held on April 30–May 1, 1985. The following Cowboys were selected.

References

Oklahoma State
Oklahoma State Cowboys football seasons
Gator Bowl champion seasons
Oklahoma State Cowboys football